And on and On... is a split album by powerviolence band Despise You and grindcore band Agoraphobic Nosebleed. It was released on April 26, 2011, through Relapse Records. It includes the first material written by Despise You since their 2007 reformation.

Background
Despise You were offered by Relapse Records and Agoraphobic Nosebleed to do a split, so they took 6 months to write material and record. The Despise You side was recorded at 818 Studios with the help of Paul Fig, and it was mixed at the studio Black Korea. The Agoraphobic Nosebleed side was recorded at Visceral Sound, with vocals being tracked at Zing Recording at Westfield, Massachusetts. The cover art, depicting a drive-by aftermath in East Los Angeles, was taken by photographer Joseph Rodriguez. The song "3/26/00" was written about Chris Elder's daughter.

Track listing

Personnel

Despise You side
Chris Elder – vocals, layout
Phil Vera – guitars
Cynthia Nishi – vocals
Rob Alaniz – drums
Chris Dodge – bass
Paul Fig – production

Agoraphobic Nosebleed side
Jay Randall – vocals, layout, lyrics
Katherine Katz – vocals
Scott Hull – guitar, vocals, production
Richard Johnson – bass
Eric Arena – vocal tracking
Chris Cannella – guitar on "As Bad As It Is..." and "Possession"

References

External links
 

2011 albums
Despise You albums
Agoraphobic Nosebleed albums
Relapse Records albums
Split albums